Film critics analyze and evaluate film.

They can be divided into journalistic critics who write for newspapers, and other popular, mass-media outlets and academic critics who are informed by film theory and publish in journals.

Notable journalistic critics 

 Taran Adarsh (indiaFM)
 James Agee (Time, The Nation)
 Hollis Alpert (Saturday Review)
 David Ansen (Newsweek)
 Michael Atkinson
 James Berardinelli
 Peter Biskind
 Peter Bogdanovich
 Hye Bossin
 Peter Bradshaw (The Guardian)
 Richard Brody (The New Yorker)
 Tom Brook (BBC)
 Ty Burr (The Boston Globe)
 Ernest Callenbach
 Vincent Canby (The New York Times)
 Charles Champlin (The Los Angeles Times)
 Justin Chang (The Los Angeles Times, Fresh Air, Variety)
 Anupama Chopra (Anupama Chopra)
 Michel Ciment (Positif)
 Jay Cocks (Time)
 Pat Collins (WWOR-TV)
 Richard Corliss (Time)
 Richard Crouse
 Bosley Crowther (The New York Times)
 Mike D'Angelo (Esquire)
 Manohla Dargis (The New York Times)
 David Denby (The New Yorker)
 Alonso Duralde (The Wrap)
 Roger Ebert (Chicago Sun-Times, At the Movies with Ebert & Roeper)
 David Edelstein (New York Magazine, NPR's Fresh Air, CBS Sunday Morning)
 Manny Farber (The New Republic)
 Otis Ferguson (The New Republic)
 Arturo Rodríguez Fernández
 John H. Foote
 Gary Franklin (KABC-TV)
 Philip French (The Observer)
 Penelope Gilliatt (The Observer, The New Yorker)
 Owen Gleiberman (Entertainment Weekly)
 Randor Guy
 Leslie Halliwell
 Jake Hamilton (Houston Chronicle)
 Molly Haskell (New York Magazine)
 J. Hoberman (The Village Voice)
 Stephen Holden (The New York Times)
 Ann Hornaday (The Washington Post)
 Stephen Hunter (The Baltimore Sun, The Washington Post)
 Pauline Kael (The New Yorker)
 Sudhish Kamath (The Hindu)
 Stanley Kauffmann (The New Republic)
 Dave Kehr (The Chicago Reader, The Chicago Tribune, The New York Daily News, The New York Times)
 Lisa Kennedy (The Denver Post)
 Glenn Kenny (Premiere)
 Mark Kermode (The Observer, BBC Radio Five Live)
 Anthony Lane (The New Yorker)
 Mick LaSalle (San Francisco Chronicle)
 Christy Lemire (Associated Press)
 Tim Lucas (Video Watchdog)
 Lou Lumenick (New York Post)
 Jeffrey Lyons (WNBC)
 Derek Malcolm (The Guardian)
 Leonard Maltin (Entertainment Tonight, Leonard Maltin's Movie Guide)
 Morton Marcus (Cinema Scene)
 Rajeev Masand (CNN-IBN, India)
 Janet Maslin (The New York Times)
 Harold McCarthy
 Todd McCarthy (Variety, The Hollywood Reporter)
 Michael Medved (New York Post, Sneak Previews)
 Nell Minow (rogerebert.com and moviedom.com)
 Elvis Mitchell (The New York Times, Fort Worth Star-Telegram, Los Angeles Herald Examiner, The Detroit Free Press)
 Khalid Mohammed (Hindustan Times)
 Joe Morgenstern (The Wall Street Journal)
 Wesley Morris (The Boston Globe)
 Vittorio Mussolini
 Kim Newman (Empire)
 Barry Norman (BBC)
 Frank Nugent (The New York Times)
 Mario Nuzzolese (Corriere della Sera)
 Robert Osborne
 Geoff Pevere
 Michael Phillips (Chicago Tribune)
 Margaret Pomeranz (At the Movies)
 Dilys Powell (The Sunday Times)
 Vasiraju Prakasam (Vaartha)
 Nathan Rabin (The A.V. Club)
 Rex Reed (New York Observer)
 B. Ruby Rich (Film Quarterly)
 Frank Rich (Time, New York)
 Carrie Rickey (Philadelphia Inquirer)
 Shirrel Rhoades
 Richard Roeper (Chicago Sun-Times, At the Movies with Ebert & Roeper)
 Jonathan Rosenbaum (Chicago Reader)
 Jonathan Ross (BBC)
 Dan Sallitt (The Los Angeles Reader, The Chicago Reader, The Village Voice, MUBI)
 Andrew Sarris (The Village Voice)
 Richard Schickel (Time)
 Paul Schrader (Film Comment)
 A. O. Scott (New York Times)
 Lisa Schwarzbaum (Entertainment Weekly)
 Matt Zoller Seitz (The House Next Door, RogerEbert.com)
 Gene Shalit (NBC's Today Show)
 Mayank Shekhar (Dainik Bhaskar)
 Tom Shone (The Sunday Times)
 Joel Siegel (Good Morning America)
 John Simon (New York, Esquire)
 Gene Siskel (Chicago Tribune, Siskel & Ebert)
 David Sterritt (The Christian Science Monitor)
 Dana Stevens (Slate)
 David Stratton (At the Movies)
 Elliott Stein (Village Voice)
 Amy Taubin (Artforum)
 Anne Thompson (Variety, The Hollywood Reporter)
 David Thomson
 Desson Thomson (The Washington Post)
 Peter Travers (Rolling Stone)
 François Truffaut (Cahiers du cinéma)
 Kenneth Turan (The Los Angeles Times, Morning Edition)
 Parker Tyler (Film Culture)
 Jan Wahl (KRON-TV)
 Alexander Walker (London Evening Standard and others)
 David Walsh (World Socialist Web Site)
 Michael Walsh ("The Province")
 Armond White (New York Press)
 Stephanie Zacharek (Time, Salon (website))
 Ziad Abdullah (The New Arab, Al Akhbar (Lebanon), Al-Hayat and Emarat Al Youm)

Notable academic critics 

 Deeksha Sharma (Filmi Indian)
 Rudolf Arnheim
 Béla Balázs
 André Bazin (Cahiers du Cinéma)
 David Bordwell
 Noël Burch
 Ernest Callenbach
 Ray Carney
 Carol J. Clover
 Hamid Dabashi
 Serge Daney (Cahiers du Cinéma, Libération, Trafic)
 Maya Deren
 Wheeler Winston Dixon
 Mary Ann Doane
 Vijayakrishnan
 Raymond Durgnat
 Sergei Eisenstein
 William K. Everson
 Ritwik Ghatak
 Denis Gifford
 Jean-Luc Godard (Cahiers du Cinéma)
 Siegfried Kracauer
 Shigehiko Hasumi
 Phillip Lopate
 Adrian Martin
 Christian Metz
 James Monaco
 Laura Mulvey
 Hugo Münsterberg
 Antonio Napolitano
 James Naremore
 Nagisa Oshima
 Margaret Pomeranz
 Satyajit Ray
 Tony Rayns
 Éric Rohmer (Cahiers du Cinéma)
 Raúl Ruiz (director)
 Jacques Rivette (Cahiers du Cinéma)
 Tadao Sato
 Kaja Silverman
 David Sterritt
 David Stratton
 Kristin Thompson
 Alexis Tioseco
 Ignatiy Vishnevetsky
 Robin Wood
 Slavoj Žižek

References

 
Critics
Film critics